Club Sportiv Năvodari, commonly known as CS Năvodari, or simply as Năvodari, is a Romanian amateur football club based in Năvodari, Constanța County founded in 1993 under the name of Midia Năvodari and re-founded in 2015 in its current version.

History

The club was originally founded in 1993, under the name of Midia Năvodari.

The club did not achieve much in its short existence, but was a solid club, playing in the Liga II for almost a decade, being involved in the promotion battle almost every season. Its best standing was Runner-up at the end of the 1999–2000 Divizia B and the 2004–05 Divizia B. Until its contract expiration in April 2003 the head coach of the team was Leonida Nedelcu and later on in 2003 it was Ionel Melenco.

The withdrawal of the club's main sponsor Petromidia, led to its dissolution in 2008.

In the summer of 2010 the city had once again a team in the Liga II after Săgeata Stejaru moved to Năvodari and was renamed Săgeata Năvodari.

In the summer of 2015, after the dissolution of Săgeata Năvodari, CS Năvodari re-founded the football department.

Honours
Liga II
Runners-up (2): 1999–00, 2004–05

Liga III
Winners (1): 1996–97

Liga IV  – Constanța County
Runners-up (1): 2019–20

Liga V – Constanța County
Winners (1): 2015–16

Managers

  Silviu Dumitrescu
  Ionel Melenco
  Leonida Nedelcu
  Ioan Sdrobiş

External links
 

Football clubs in Constanța County
Association football clubs established in 1993
Liga II clubs
Liga III clubs
Liga IV clubs
1993 establishments in Romania